

Events
March 22 – Daniel Barenboim is awarded the Otto Hahn Peace Medal for his work with the West-Eastern Divan Orchestra.
March 29 – Protesters interrupt a concert by the Jerusalem Quartet at London's Wigmore Hall.
June 8 – The Gregynog Music Festival opens; performers include Emma Kirkby, Catrin Finch and The Academy of Ancient Music.
July 11 – Rachel Barton Pine gives a three-part performance at Chicago's Millennium Park as part of the "Great Performers of Illinois" celebration.
August – Frank Huang leaves the Ying Quartet.
August 13 – The Three Choirs Festival Youth Choir give their first concert, at Tewkesbury Abbey, performing Handel’s "Zadok the Priest", "Water Music (Suite No 2 in D)" and "My Heart is Inditing", and Bach’s "Magnificat", accompanied by the Corelli Chamber Orchestra.

New works
Steven Bryant – Concerto for Wind Ensemble
Mehdi Hosseini
Taleshi Hava, for solo violin and bassoon
An Unfinished Draft, for flute, clarinet, piano, violin, violoncello and baritone
Pause, for flute, clarinet, piano, violin, violoncello and tubular bells
Wojciech Kilar – The Solemn Overture, for symphony orchestra
Fred Lerdahl – Arches
Bruno Mantovani – Concerto de chambre nos 1 and 2
Krzysztof Penderecki
Ein feste Burg ist unser Gott for mixed choir, brass, percussion and string orchestra
 (A sea of dreams did breathe on me... Songs of reverie and nostalgia)
Duo concertante, for violin and double bass
Tanz, for solo viola
Steve Reich – WTC 9/11
Kaija Saariaho – Mirages
Esa-Pekka Salonen – Nyx, for orchestra
Johannes Maria Staud
On Comparative Meteorology, for orchestra
Contrebande (On Comparative Meteorology II), for orchestra
Tondo Preludio, for orchestra
Chant d'amour, for ensemble
Manfred Trojahn – Herbstmusik, for orchestra
Graham Waterhouse – Chinese Whispers

Opera premieres

Albums
Jack Cooper – The Chamber Wind Music of Jack Cooper
Jackie Evancho – O Holy Night
Jon Lord – To Notice Such Things
Frederik Magle – Like a Flame
Maksim Mrvica – Appassionata
Les Prêtres – Spiritus Dei

Musical films
Kinshasa Symphony

Deaths
January 8 – Otmar Suitner, Austrian conductor, 87
January 22 – Surendran Reddy, South African pianist and composer, 47 
January 23 – Earl Wild, US pianist, 94
February 2 – Nelli Shkolnikova, Russian violinist, 81
February 9 – Jacques Hétu, Canadian composer and music teacher, 71
February 11 – Irina Arkhipova, Russian operatic mezzo-soprano and later contralto, 85 
February 17 – Kathryn Grayson, 88, American soprano and film star
February 18 – Ariel Ramírez, Argentine composer, 88
March – Farman Behboud, Iranian pianist and piano teacher, 63
March 4 – Amalie Christie, Norwegian classical pianist, author and anthroposophist, 96
March 5 – Philip Langridge, English operatic tenor, 70 
March 17 – Ştefan Gheorghiu, Romanian violinist, 83
March 23 – Blanche Thebom, 91, American mezzo-soprano
April 1 – Morag Beaton, 83, Scottish-Australian soprano
April 10 – William Walker, 78, American baritone and General Director of the Fort Worth Opera
April 27 – Morris Pert, Scottish percussionist, pianist and composer, 62
April 29 – Johannes Fritsch, German composer, 68
May 5 – Giulietta Simionato, Italian operatic mezzo-soprano, 99
May 17 – Yvonne Loriod, French pianist, teacher, and composer, 86
May 24 – Anneliese Rothenberger, 83, German soprano
May 25 – Siphiwo Ntshebe, South African operatic tenor, 35 (meningitis) 
June 2 – Giuseppe Taddei, Italian operatic baritone, 93
June 5 – Arne Nordheim, Norwegian composer, 78
June 12 – Fuat Mansurov, Russian conductor, 82
June 14 – Giacinto Prandelli, Italian operatic tenor, 96
June 18 – Kalmen Opperman, American clarinetist, teacher, conductor and instrument maker, 90
July 1 – John Paynter, British composer and music educator, 78
July 5 – Cesare Siepi, 87, Italian bass
July 12 – John Douglas, American conductor, voice teacher and accompanist, 54 (melanoma)
July 14 – Sir Charles Mackerras, Australian conductor, 84
July 15 – Luo Pinchao, Chinese opera singer, 98
June 16 – Maureen Forrester, 79, Canadian contralto
July 21 – Anthony Rolfe Johnson, British tenor, 69
August 6 – Cacilda Borges Barbosa, Brazilian pianist, conductor and composer, 96
September 11 – Herbert Grossman, American conductor, 83
September 12 – Charles Ansbacher, American conductor, 67
September 19 – László Polgár, Hungarian operatic bass, 63
September 21 – Geoffrey Burgon, British film and TV score composer, 69
September 28 – Dolores Wilson, American operatic soprano, 82
October 10
Alison Stephens, English mandolin player, 40 (cervical cancer)
Joan Sutherland, Australian operatic soprano, 83
October 30 – Morris Pert, Scottish composer, drummer /percussionist and pianist, 62 
November 2 – Rudolf Barshai, Russian violist and composer, 86
November 5 – Shirley Verrett, American mezzo-soprano, 79
November 12 – Henryk Górecki, Polish composer, 74
November 30 – Peter Hofmann, German operatic tenor, 66
December 6 – Hugues Cuénod, Swiss operatic tenor, 108
December 7 – Sergiu Luca, Romanian violinist, 67
December 15 – Hilde Rössel-Majdan, Austrian operatic contralto, 89 
December 16 – Richard Adeney, British flautist, 90

Major awards

Pulitzer Prize in Music
Jennifer Higdon – Violin Concerto

Classical Brits
Composer of the Year – Thomas Adès
Male Artist of the Year – Vasily Petrenko
Female Artist Of The Year – Angela Gheorghiu
Critics' Award – Antonio Pappano

Grammy Awards
See 52nd Grammy Awards

Composer's Guild Grand Prize
Greg Danner

See also
 2010 in opera

References

Clssical
Classical music by year